John W. Short (born August 24, 1964) is an American politician and a Democratic member of the Kentucky House of Representatives representing District 92 since January 4, 2011.

Elections
2012 Short was challenged in the May 22, 2012 Democratic Primary, winning with 3,934 votes (75.9%) and was unopposed for the November 6, 2012 General election, winning with 9,807 votes.
2010 Short challenged District 92 incumbent Representative Ancel Smith in the May 18, 2010 Democratic Primary, winning with 6,474 votes (52.3%) and won the November 2, 2010 General election with 10,149 votes (72.7%) against Republican nominee Ruby Couch.

References

External links
Official page at the Kentucky General Assembly

John Short at Ballotpedia
John W. Short at the National Institute on Money in State Politics

Place of birth missing (living people)
1964 births
Living people
Democratic Party members of the Kentucky House of Representatives
People from Hindman, Kentucky
21st-century American politicians